Lysergic acid diethylamide, commonly known as LSD (from German ), also known colloquially as acid, is a potent psychedelic drug. Effects typically include intensified thoughts, emotions, and sensory perception. At sufficiently high dosages LSD manifests primarily mental, visual, as well as auditory, hallucinations. Dilated pupils, increased blood pressure, and increased body temperature are typical. Effects typically begin within half an hour and can last for up to 20 hours. LSD is also capable of causing mystical experiences and ego dissolution. It is used mainly as a recreational drug or for spiritual reasons. LSD is both the prototypical psychedelic and one of the "classical" psychedelics, being the psychedelics with the greatest scientific and cultural significance. LSD is typically either swallowed or held under the tongue. It is most often sold on blotter paper and less commonly as tablets, in a watery solution or in gelatin squares called panes.

LSD is considered to be non-addictive with low potential for abuse. Despite this, the US government made it illegal as part of the 'War on Drugs' after experimenting on people with it during MKULTRA.  Frequent use rapidly builds tolerance, requiring exponentially larger doses to feel an effect. Adverse psychological reactions are possible, such as anxiety, paranoia, and delusions. LSD is active in small amounts relative to other psychoactive compounds with doses measured in micrograms. It is possible for LSD to induce either intermittent or chronic visual hallucinations, in spite of no further use. Common effects include visual snow and palinopsia. In cases where this causes distress or impairment it is diagnosed as hallucinogen persisting perception disorder (HPPD). While overdose from LSD is unknown, LSD can cause injury and death as a result of accidents stemming from psychological impairment. The effects of LSD are thought to stem primarily from it being an agonist at the 5-HT2A (serotonin) receptor, and while exactly how LSD exerts its effects by agonism at this receptor is still not fully known, corresponding increased glutamatergic neurotransmission and reduced default mode network activity are thought to be key mechanisms of action. In addition to serotonin, LSD also binds to dopamine D1 and D2 receptors, which is why LSD tends to be more stimulating than compounds such as psilocybin. In pure form, LSD is clear or white in color, has no smell, and is crystalline. It breaks down with exposure to ultraviolet light.

LSD was first synthesized by Swiss chemist Albert Hofmann in 1938 from lysergic acid, a chemical derived from the hydrolysis of ergotamine, an alkaloid found in ergot, a fungus that infects grain. LSD was the 25th of various lysergamides Hofmann synthesized from lysergic acid while trying to develop a new analeptic, hence the alternate name LSD-25. Hofmann discovered its effects in humans in 1943, after unintentionally ingesting an unknown amount, possibly absorbing it through his skin. LSD was subject to exceptional interest within the field of psychiatry in the 1950s and early 1960s, with Sandoz distributing LSD to researchers under the trademark name Delysid in an attempt to find a marketable use for it.

LSD-assisted psychotherapy was used in the 1950s and early 1960s by psychiatrists such as Humphry Osmond, who pioneered the application of LSD to the treatment of alcoholism, with promising results. Osmond coined the term "psychedelic" (lit. mind manifesting) as a term for LSD and related hallucinogens, superseding the previously held "psychotomimetic" model in which LSD was believed to mimic schizophrenia. In contrast to schizophrenia, LSD induces transcendental experiences with lasting psychological benefit. During this time, the Central Intelligence Agency (CIA) began using LSD in the research project Project MKUltra, which used psychoactive substances to aid interrogation. The CIA administered LSD to unwitting test subjects in order to observe how they would react, the most well-known example of this being Operation Midnight Climax. LSD was one of several psychoactive substances evaluated by the U.S. Army Chemical Corps as possible non-lethal incapacitants in the Edgewood Arsenal human experiments.

In the 1960s, LSD and other psychedelics were adopted by, and became synonymous with, the counterculture movement due to their perceived ability to expand consciousness. This resulted in LSD being viewed as a cultural threat to American values and the Vietnam war effort, and it was designated as a Schedule I (illegal for medical as well as recreational use) substance in 1968. It was listed as a Schedule 1 controlled substance by the United Nations in 1971 and currently has no approved medical uses. , about 10% of people in the United States have used LSD at some point in their lives, while 0.7% have used it in the last year. It was most popular in the 1960s to 1980s. The use of LSD among US adults increased 56.4% from 2015 to 2018.

Uses

Recreational
LSD is commonly used as a recreational drug in the company of friends, in large crowds, or by oneself.

Spiritual
LSD can catalyze intense spiritual experiences and is thus considered an entheogen. Some users have reported out of body experiences. In 1966, Timothy Leary established the League for Spiritual Discovery with LSD as its sacrament.  Stanislav Grof has written that religious and mystical experiences observed during LSD sessions appear to be phenomenologically indistinguishable from similar descriptions in the sacred scriptures of the great religions of the world and the texts of ancient civilizations.

Medical

LSD currently has no approved uses in medicine. A meta analysis concluded that a single dose was effective at reducing alcohol consumption in alcoholism. LSD has also been studied in depression, anxiety, and drug dependence, with positive preliminary results.

Effects
LSD is exceptionally potent, with as little as 20 μg capable of producing a noticeable effect.

Physical
LSD can cause pupil dilation, reduced appetite, profuse sweating and wakefulness. Other physical reactions to LSD are highly variable and nonspecific, some of which may be secondary to the psychological effects of LSD. Among the reported symptoms are elevated body temperature, blood sugar, and heart rate, alongside goose bumps, jaw clenching, mouth dryness, and hyperreflexia. In negative experiences, numbness, weakness, nausea, and tremors have also been exhibited.

Psychological
The most common immediate psychological effects of LSD are visual hallucinations and illusions (colloquially known as "trips"), which vary depending on how much is used and how the dosage interacts with the brain. Trips usually start within 20–30 minutes of taking LSD orally (less if snorted or taken intravenously), peak three to four hours after ingestion, and can last up to 20 hours in high doses. Users may also experience an "afterglow" of improved mood or perceived mental state for days or even weeks after ingestion in some experiences. Good trips are reportedly deeply stimulating and pleasurable, and typically involve intense joy or euphoria, a greater appreciation for life, reduced anxiety, a sense of spiritual enlightenment, and a sense of belonging or interconnectedness with the universe. Negative experiences, colloquially known as "bad trips," evoke an array of dark emotions, such as irrational fear, anxiety, panic, paranoia, dread, distrustfulness, hopelessness, and even suicidal ideation. While it is impossible to predict when a bad trip will occur, one's mood, surroundings, sleep, hydration, social setting, and other factors can be controlled (colloquially referred to as "set and setting") to minimize the risk of a bad trip.

Sensory
LSD causes an animated sensory experience of senses, emotions, memories, time, and awareness for 6 to 20 hours, depending on dosage and tolerance. Generally beginning within 30 to 90 minutes after ingestion, the user may experience anything from subtle changes in perception to overwhelming cognitive shifts. Changes in auditory and visual perception are also typical.

Some sensory effects may include an experience of radiant or more vibrant colors, objects and surfaces appearing to ripple, "breathe," or otherwise move, spinning fractals superimposed on one's vision, colored patterns behind closed eyelids, an altered sense of time, geometric patterns emerging on walls and other textured objects, and morphing objects. Some users also report a strong metallic taste for the duration of the effects. Food's texture or taste may be different, and users may also have an aversion to foods that they would normally enjoy. Similar effects have also been found in rats.

Some report that the inanimate world appears to animate in an inexplicable way; for instance, objects that are static in three dimensions can seem to be moving relative to one or more additional spatial dimensions. Many of the basic visual effects resemble the phosphenes seen after applying pressure to the eye and have also been studied as form constants. Sometimes these effects and patterns can be changed when concentrated on, or can change based on thoughts, emotions or music. The auditory effects of LSD may include echo-like distortions of sounds, changes in ability to discern concurrent auditory and visual stimuli, and a general intensification of the experience of music. Higher doses often cause intense and fundamental distortions of sensory perception such as synesthesia, the experience of additional spatial or temporal dimensions, and temporary dissociation.

Adverse effects

Out of the 20 drugs ranked in order of individual and societal harm by David Nutt, LSD was third to last, or approximately one-tenth as harmful as alcohol. The most significant adverse effect of LSD was impairment of mental functioning while intoxicated.

Mental disorders
LSD may trigger panic attacks or feelings of extreme anxiety, known colloquially as a "bad trip". Although population studies have not found an increased incidence of mental illness in psychedelic drug users overall, with psychedelic users actually having lower rates of depression and substance abuse than the control group, there is evidence that people with severe mental illnesses like schizophrenia have a higher likelihood of experiencing adverse effects from taking LSD.

Suggestibility
While publicly available documents indicate that the CIA and Department of Defense have discontinued research into the use of LSD as a means of mind control, research from the 1960s suggests that both mentally ill and healthy people are more suggestible while under its influence.

Flashbacks
"Flashbacks" are a reported psychological phenomenon in which an individual experiences an episode of some of LSD's subjective effects after the drug has worn off, persisting for days or months after hallucinogen use. Individuals with hallucinogen persisting perception disorder experience intermittent or chronic flashbacks that cause distress or impairment in life and work.

The etiology of the "flashback" phenomenon appears to be varied. Some researchers such as Krebs and Johansen (2015) attribute at least some of the cases to be related to somatic symptom disorder, when people fixate on normal somatic experiences and perceptions that they weren't aware of before consuming the drug. Other researchers relate it to an associative reaction to a contextual cue akin to what people that have faced trauma or strongly emotional experiences face when receiving a triggering stimulus (Holland and Passie 2011). There is no consensus on what are the risk factors but some researchers theorize that pre-existing psychopathologies may be a significant contributor (Abraham and Duffy 1996)

The prevalence of HPPD is difficult to estimate but appears to be very rare (Halpern et al 2016), with estimates ranging from 1 in 20 users for the transitory and less serious type 1 HPPD, to 1 in 50,000 users for the more concerning type 2 HPPD.

Contrary to rumors circulating the internet that LSD is stored in the spinal cord or other parts of your body long-term, the pharmacological evidence (Passie et all 2008) shows LSD has a short half-life of 175 minutes, undergoing enzymatic metabolism into more polar and therefore water-soluble compounds such as 2-oxo-3-hydroxy-LSD that are eliminated through the urine. No evidence of long term storage of LSD in the body exists.

Cancer and pregnancy
The mutagenic potential of LSD is unclear. Overall, the evidence seems to point to limited or no effect at commonly used doses. Studies showed no evidence of teratogenic or mutagenic effects.

Addiction and tolerance
Tolerance to LSD builds up with consistent use and cross-tolerance has been demonstrated between LSD, mescaline,
and psilocybin.
Researchers believe that tolerance returns to baseline after two weeks of not using psychedelics.

The NIH states that LSD is addictive, while most other sources state it is not. A 2009 textbook states that it "rarely produce[s] compulsive use." A 2006 review states it is readily abused, but does not result in addiction. There are no recorded successful attempts to train animals to self-administer LSD in laboratory settings.

Overdose
A report in 2008 stated that, though there was no "comprehensive review since the 1950s" and "almost no legal clinical research" since the 1970s, there had been "no documented human deaths from an LSD overdose". Eight individuals who accidentally consumed very high amounts by mistaking LSD for cocaine developed comatose states, hyperthermia, vomiting, gastric bleeding, and respiratory problems—all survived, however, with hospital treatment and without residual effects. According to more recent reports, several behavioral-related fatalities and suicides have occurred due to LSD.
Reassurance in a calm, safe environment is beneficial. Agitation can be safely addressed with benzodiazepines such as lorazepam or diazepam. Neuroleptics such as haloperidol are not recommended because they may have adverse effects. LSD is rapidly absorbed, so activated charcoal and emptying of the stomach is of little benefit, unless done within 30–60 minutes of ingesting an overdose of LSD. Sedation or physical restraint is rarely required, and excessive restraint may cause complications such as hyperthermia (over-heating) or rhabdomyolysis.

Massive doses "should be treated with supportive care, including respiratory support and endotracheal intubation if needed. Hypertension [high blood pressure], tachycardia [rapid heart-beat], and hyperthermia should be treated symptomatically. Hypotension [low blood pressure] should be treated initially with fluids and subsequently with pressors if required." "Intravenous administration of anticoagulants, vasodilators, and sympatholytics may be useful" when treating ergotism.

Pharmacology

Pharmacodynamics

Most serotonergic psychedelics are not significantly dopaminergic, and LSD is therefore atypical in this regard. The agonism of the D2 receptor by LSD may contribute to its psychoactive effects in humans.

LSD binds to most serotonin receptor subtypes except for the 5-HT3 and 5-HT4 receptors. However, most of these receptors are affected at too low affinity to be sufficiently activated by the brain concentration of approximately 10–20 nM. In humans, recreational doses of LSD can affect 5-HT1A (Ki=1.1nM), 5-HT2A (Ki=2.9nM), 5-HT2B (Ki=4.9nM), 5-HT2C (Ki=23nM), 5-HT5A (Ki=9nM [in cloned rat tissues]), and 5-HT6 receptors (Ki=2.3nM).  Although not present in humans, 5-HT5B receptors found in rodents also have a high affinity for LSD.  The psychedelic effects of LSD are attributed to cross-activation of 5-HT2A receptor heteromers. Many but not all 5-HT2A agonists are psychedelics and 5-HT2A antagonists block the psychedelic activity of LSD. LSD exhibits functional selectivity at the 5-HT2A and 5HT2C receptors in that it activates the signal transduction enzyme phospholipase A2 instead of activating the enzyme phospholipase C as the endogenous ligand serotonin does.

Exactly how LSD produces its effects is unknown, but it is thought that it works by increasing glutamate release in the cerebral cortex and therefore excitation in this area, specifically in layers IV and V. LSD, like many other drugs of recreational use, has been shown to activate DARPP-32-related pathways. The drug enhances dopamine D2 receptor protomer recognition and signaling of D2–5-HT2A receptor complexes, which may contribute to its psychotropic effects. LSD has been shown to have low affinity for H1 receptors, displaying antihistamine effects.

LSD is a biased agonist that induces a conformation in serotonin receptors that preferentially recruits β-arrestin over activating G proteins. LSD also has an exceptionally long residence time when bound to serotonin receptors lasting hours, consistent with the long lasting effects of LSD despite its relatively rapid clearance. A crystal structure of 5-HT2B bound to LSD reveals an extracellular loop that forms a lid over the diethylamide end of the binding cavity which explains the slow rate of LSD unbinding from serotonin receptors. The related lysergamide lysergic acid amide (LSA) that lacks the diethylamide moiety is far less hallucinogenic in comparison.

Pharmacokinetics
The effects of LSD normally last between 6 and 12 hours depending on dosage, tolerance, and age. The Sandoz prospectus for "Delysid" warned: "intermittent disturbances of affect may occasionally persist for several days." Aghajanian and Bing (1964) found LSD had an elimination half-life of only 175 minutes (about 3 hours). However, using more accurate techniques, Papac and Foltz (1990) reported that 1 µg/kg oral LSD given to a single male volunteer had an apparent plasma half-life of 5.1 hours, with a peak plasma concentration of 5 ng/mL at 3 hours post-dose.

The pharmacokinetics of LSD were not properly determined until 2015, which is not surprising for a drug with the kind of low-μg potency that LSD possesses. In a sample of 16 healthy subjects, a single mid-range 200 μg oral dose of LSD was found to produce mean maximal concentrations of 4.5 ng/mL at a median of 1.5 hours (range 0.5–4 hours) post-administration. Concentrations of LSD decreased following first-order kinetics with a half-life of 3.6±0.9 hours and a terminal half-life of 8.9±5.9 hours.

The effects of the dose of LSD given lasted for up to 12 hours and were closely correlated with the concentrations of LSD present in circulation over time, with no acute tolerance observed. Only 1% of the drug was eliminated in urine unchanged, whereas 13% was eliminated as the major metabolite 2-oxo-3-hydroxy-LSD (O-H-LSD) within 24 hours. O-H-LSD is formed by cytochrome P450 enzymes, although the specific enzymes involved are unknown, and it does not appear to be known whether O-H-LSD is pharmacologically active or not. The oral bioavailability of LSD was crudely estimated as approximately 71% using previous data on intravenous administration of LSD. The sample was equally divided between male and female subjects and there were no significant sex differences observed in the pharmacokinetics of LSD.

Chemistry

LSD is a chiral compound with two stereocenters at the carbon atoms C-5 and C-8, so that theoretically four different optical isomers of LSD could exist. LSD, also called (+)-D-LSD, has the absolute configuration (5R,8R). The C-5 isomers of lysergamides do not exist in nature and are not formed during the synthesis from d-lysergic acid. Retrosynthetically, the C-5 stereocenter could be analysed as having the same configuration of the alpha carbon of the naturally occurring amino acid L-tryptophan, the precursor to all biosynthetic ergoline compounds.

However, LSD and iso-LSD, the two C-8 isomers, rapidly interconvert in the presence of bases, as the alpha proton is acidic and can be deprotonated and reprotonated. Non-psychoactive iso-LSD which has formed during the synthesis can be separated by chromatography and can be isomerized to LSD.

Pure salts of LSD are triboluminescent, emitting small flashes of white light when shaken in the dark. LSD is strongly fluorescent and will glow bluish-white under UV light.

Synthesis
LSD is an ergoline derivative. It is commonly synthesized by reacting diethylamine with an activated form of lysergic acid. Activating reagents include phosphoryl chloride and peptide coupling reagents. Lysergic acid is made by alkaline hydrolysis of lysergamides like ergotamine, a substance usually derived from the ergot fungus on agar plate; or, theoretically possible, but impractical and uncommon, from ergine (lysergic acid amide, LSA) extracted from morning glory seeds. Lysergic acid can also be produced synthetically, although these processes are not used in clandestine manufacture due to their low yields and high complexity.

Research
The precursor for LSD, lysergic acid, has been produced by GMO baker's yeast.

Dosage

A single dose of LSD may be between 40 and 500 micrograms—an amount roughly equal to one-tenth the mass of a grain of sand. Threshold effects can be felt with as little as 25 micrograms of LSD. The practice of using sub-threshold doses is called microdosing. Dosages of LSD are measured in micrograms (µg), or millionths of a gram. By comparison, dosages of most drugs, both recreational and medicinal, are measured in milligrams (mg), or thousandths of a gram.

In the mid-1960s, the most important black market LSD manufacturer (Owsley Stanley) distributed LSD at a standard concentration of 270 µg, while street samples of the 1970s contained 30 to 300 µg. By the 1980s, the amount had reduced to between 100 and 125 µg, dropping more in the 1990s to the 20–80 µg range,  and even more in the 2000s (decade).

Reactivity and degradation
"LSD," writes the chemist Alexander Shulgin, "is an unusually fragile molecule ... As a salt, in water, cold, and free from air and light exposure, it is stable indefinitely."

LSD has two labile protons at the tertiary stereogenic C5 and C8 positions, rendering these centers prone to epimerisation. The C8 proton is more labile due to the electron-withdrawing carboxamide attachment, but removal of the chiral proton at the C5 position (which was once also an alpha proton of the parent molecule tryptophan) is assisted by the inductively withdrawing nitrogen and pi electron delocalisation with the indole ring.

LSD also has enamine-type reactivity because of the electron-donating effects of the indole ring. Because of this, chlorine destroys LSD molecules on contact; even though chlorinated tap water contains only a slight amount of chlorine, the small quantity of compound typical to an LSD solution will likely be eliminated when dissolved in tap water. The double bond between the 8-position and the aromatic ring, being conjugated with the indole ring, is susceptible to nucleophilic attacks by water or alcohol, especially in the presence of UV or other kinds of light. LSD often converts to "lumi-LSD," which is inactive in human beings.

A controlled study was undertaken to determine the stability of LSD in pooled urine samples.
The concentrations of LSD in urine samples were followed over time at various temperatures, in different types of storage containers, at various exposures to different wavelengths of light, and at varying pH values. These studies demonstrated no significant loss in LSD concentration at 25 °C for up to four weeks. After four weeks of incubation, a 30% loss in LSD concentration at 37 °C and up to a 40% at 45 °C were observed. Urine fortified with LSD and stored in amber glass or nontransparent polyethylene containers showed no change in concentration under any light conditions. Stability of LSD in transparent containers under light was dependent on the distance between the light source and the samples, the wavelength of light, exposure time, and the intensity of light. After prolonged exposure to heat in alkaline pH conditions, 10 to 15% of the parent LSD epimerized to iso-LSD. Under acidic conditions, less than 5% of the LSD was converted to iso-LSD. It was also demonstrated that trace amounts of metal ions in buffer or urine could catalyze the decomposition of LSD and that this process can be avoided by the addition of EDTA.

Detection
LSD may be quantified in urine as part of a drug abuse testing program, in plasma or serum to confirm a diagnosis of poisoning in hospitalized victims or in whole blood to assist in a forensic investigation of a traffic or other criminal violation or a case of sudden death. Both the parent drug and its major metabolite are unstable in biofluids when exposed to light, heat or alkaline conditions and therefore specimens are protected from light, stored at the lowest possible temperature and analyzed quickly to minimize losses.

Maximum plasma concentrations were found to be 1.4 and 1.5 hours after oral administration of 100µg and 200µg respectively with a plasma half-life of 2.6 hours (ranging from 2.2–3.4 hours among 40 human test subjects).

LSD can be detected using an Ehrlich's reagent and a Hofmann's reagent.

History

LSD was first synthesized on November 16, 1938 by Swiss chemist Albert Hofmann at the Sandoz Laboratories in Basel, Switzerland as part of a large research program searching for medically useful ergot alkaloid derivatives. The abbreviation "LSD" is from the German "Lysergsäurediethylamid".

LSD's psychedelic properties were discovered 5 years later when Hofmann himself accidentally ingested an unknown quantity of the chemical. The first intentional ingestion of LSD occurred on April 19, 1943, when Hofmann ingested 250 µg of LSD. He said this would be a threshold dose based on the dosages of other ergot alkaloids. Hofmann found the effects to be much stronger than he anticipated. Sandoz Laboratories introduced LSD as a psychiatric drug in 1947 and marketed LSD as a psychiatric panacea, hailing it "as a cure for everything from schizophrenia to criminal behavior, 'sexual perversions', and alcoholism." Sandoz would send the drug for free to researchers investigating its effects.

Beginning in the 1950s, the US Central Intelligence Agency (CIA) began a research program code named Project MKUltra. The CIA introduced LSD to the United States, purchasing the entire world's supply for $240,000 and propagating the LSD through CIA front organizations to American hospitals, clinics, prisons and research centers. Experiments included administering LSD to CIA employees, military personnel, doctors, other government agents, prostitutes, mentally ill patients, and members of the general public in order to study their reactions, usually without the subjects' knowledge. The project was revealed in the US congressional Rockefeller Commission report in 1975.

In 1963, the Sandoz patents on LSD expired and the Czech company Spofa began to produce the substance. Sandoz stopped the production and distribution in 1965. 

Several figures, including Aldous Huxley, Timothy Leary, and Al Hubbard, had begun to advocate the consumption of LSD. LSD became central to the counterculture of the 1960s. In the early 1960s the use of LSD and other hallucinogens was advocated by new proponents of consciousness expansion such as Leary, Huxley, Alan Watts and Arthur Koestler, and according to L. R. Veysey they profoundly influenced the thinking of the new generation of youth.

On October 24, 1968, possession of LSD was made illegal in the United States. The last FDA approved study of LSD in patients ended in 1980, while a study in healthy volunteers was made in the late 1980s. Legally approved and regulated psychiatric use of LSD continued in Switzerland until 1993.

In November 2020, Oregon became the first US state to decriminalize possession of small amounts of LSD after voters approved Ballot Measure 110.

Society and culture

Counterculture

By the mid-1960s, the youth countercultures in California, particularly in San Francisco, had adopted the use of hallucinogenic drugs, with the first major underground LSD factory established by Owsley Stanley. From 1964, the Merry Pranksters, a loose group that developed around novelist Ken Kesey, sponsored the Acid Tests, a series of events primarily staged in or near San Francisco, involving the taking of LSD (supplied by Stanley), accompanied by light shows, film projection and discordant, improvised music known as the psychedelic symphony. The Pranksters helped popularize LSD use, through their road trips across America in a psychedelically decorated converted school bus, which involved distributing the drug and meeting with major figures of the beat movement, and through publications about their activities such as Tom Wolfe's The Electric Kool-Aid Acid Test (1968).

In San Francisco's Haight-Ashbury neighborhood, brothers Ron and Jay Thelin opened the Psychedelic Shop in January 1966. The Thelins opened the store to promote safe use of LSD, which was then still legal in California. The Psychedelic Shop helped to further popularize LSD in the Haight and to make the neighborhood the unofficial capital of the hippie counterculture in the United States. Ron Thelin was also involved in organizing the Love Pageant rally, a protest held in Golden Gate park to protest California's newly adopted ban on LSD in October 1966. At the rally, hundreds of attendees took acid in unison. Although the Psychedelic Shop closed after barely a year-and-a-half in business, its role in popularizing LSD was considerable.

A similar and connected nexus of LSD use in the creative arts developed around the same time in London. A key figure in this phenomenon in the UK was British academic Michael Hollingshead, who first tried LSD in America in 1961 while he was the Executive Secretary for the Institute of British-American Cultural Exchange. After being given a large quantity of pure Sandoz LSD (which was still legal at the time) and experiencing his first "trip," Hollingshead contacted Aldous Huxley, who suggested that he get in touch with Harvard academic Timothy Leary, and over the next few years, in concert with Leary and Richard Alpert, Hollingshead played a major role in their famous LSD research at Millbrook before moving to New York City, where he conducted his own LSD experiments. In 1965 Hollingshead returned to the UK and founded the World Psychedelic Center in Chelsea, London.

Music and art

In both music and art, the influence of LSD was soon being more widely seen and heard thanks to the bands that participated in the Acid Tests and related events, including the Grateful Dead, Jefferson Airplane and Big Brother and the Holding Company, and through the inventive poster and album art of San Francisco-based artists like Rick Griffin, Victor Moscoso, Bonnie MacLean, Stanley Mouse & Alton Kelley, and Wes Wilson, meant to evoke the visual experience of an LSD trip. LSD had a strong influence on the Grateful Dead and the culture of "Deadheads."

Among the many famous people in the UK that Michael Hollingshead is reputed to have introduced to LSD are artist and Hipgnosis founder Storm Thorgerson, and musicians Donovan, Keith Richards, Paul McCartney, John Lennon, and George Harrison. Although establishment concern about the new drug led to it being declared an illegal drug by the Home Secretary in 1966, LSD was soon being used widely in the upper echelons of the British art and music scene, including members of the Beatles, the Rolling Stones, the Moody Blues, the Small Faces, Syd Barrett, Jimi Hendrix and others, and the products of these experiences were soon being both heard and seen by the public with singles like the Small Faces' "Itchycoo Park" and LPs like the Beatles' Sgt. Pepper's Lonely Hearts Club Band and Cream's Disraeli Gears, which featured music that showed the obvious influence of the musicians' recent psychedelic excursions, and which were packaged in elaborately-designed album covers that featured vividly-coloured psychedelic artwork by artists like Peter Blake, Martin Sharp, Hapshash and the Coloured Coat (Nigel Waymouth and Michael English) and art/music collective The Fool.

In the 1960s, musicians from psychedelic music and psychedelic rock bands began to refer (at first indirectly, and later explicitly) to the drug and attempted to recreate or reflect the experience of taking LSD in their music. A number of features are often included in psychedelic music. Exotic instrumentation, with a particular fondness for the sitar and tabla are common. Electric guitars are used to create feedback, and are played through wah wah and fuzzbox effect pedals.  Elaborate studio effects are often used, such as backwards tapes, panning, phasing, long delay loops, and extreme reverb. In the 1960s there was a use of primitive electronic instruments such as early synthesizers and the theremin. Later forms of electronic psychedelia also employed repetitive computer-generated beats. Songs allegedly referring to LSD include John Prine's "Illegal Smile" and the Beatles' song "Lucy in the Sky with Diamonds," although the authors of the latter song repeatedly denied this claim.

In modern times, LSD has had a prominent influence on artists such as Keith Haring, electronic dance music, and the jam band Phish.

Legal status
The United Nations Convention on Psychotropic Substances (adopted in 1971) requires the signing parties to prohibit LSD. Hence, it is illegal in all countries that were parties to the convention, including the United States, Australia, New Zealand, and most of Europe. However, enforcement of those laws varies from country to country. Medical and scientific research with LSD in humans is permitted under the 1971 UN Convention.

Australia
LSD is a Schedule 9 prohibited substance in Australia under the Poisons Standard (February 2017). A Schedule 9 substance is defined as a substance which may be abused or misused, the manufacture, possession, sale or use of which should be prohibited by law except when required for medical or scientific research, or for analytical, teaching or training purposes with approval of Commonwealth and/or State or Territory Health Authorities.

In Western Australia section 9 of the Misuse of Drugs Act 1981 provides for summary trial before a magistrate for possession of less than 0.004g; section 11 provides rebuttable presumptions of intent to sell or supply if the quantity is 0.002g or more, or of possession for the purpose of trafficking if 0.01g.

Canada
In Canada, LSD is a controlled substance under Schedule III of the Controlled Drugs and Substances Act. Every person who seeks to obtain the substance, without disclosing authorization to obtain such substances 30 days before obtaining another prescription from a practitioner, is guilty of an indictable offence and liable to imprisonment for a term not exceeding 3 years. Possession for purpose of trafficking is an indictable offence punishable by imprisonment for 10 years.

United Kingdom
In the United Kingdom, LSD is a Schedule 1 Class "A" drug. This means it has no recognized legitimate uses and possession of the drug without a licence is punishable with 7 years' imprisonment and/or an unlimited fine, and trafficking is punishable with life imprisonment and an unlimited fine (see main article on drug punishments Misuse of Drugs Act 1971).

In 2000, after consultation with members of the Royal College of Psychiatrists' Faculty of Substance Misuse, the UK Police Foundation issued the Runciman Report which recommended "the transfer of LSD from Class A to Class B."

In November 2009, the UK Transform Drug Policy Foundation released in the House of Commons a guidebook to the legal regulation of drugs, After the War on Drugs: Blueprint for Regulation, which details options for regulated distribution and sale of LSD and other psychedelics.

United States
LSD is Schedule I in the United States, according to the Controlled Substances Act of 1970. This means LSD is illegal to manufacture, buy, possess, process, or distribute without a license from the Drug Enforcement Administration (DEA). By classifying LSD as a Schedule I substance, the DEA holds that LSD meets the following three criteria: it is deemed to have a high potential for abuse; it has no legitimate medical use in treatment; and there is a lack of accepted safety for its use under medical supervision. There are no documented deaths from chemical toxicity; most LSD deaths are a result of behavioral toxicity.

There can also be substantial discrepancies between the amount of chemical LSD that one possesses and the amount of possession with which one can be charged in the US. This is because LSD is almost always present in a medium (e.g. blotter or neutral liquid), and in some contexts, the amount that can be considered with respect to sentencing is the total mass of the drug and its medium. This discrepancy was the subject of 1995 United States Supreme Court case, Neal v. United States, which determined that for finding minimum sentence lengths, the total medium weight is used, while for determining the severity of the offense, an estimation of the chemical mass is used.

Lysergic acid and lysergic acid amide, LSD precursors, are both classified in Schedule III of the Controlled Substances Act. Ergotamine tartrate, a precursor to lysergic acid, is regulated under the Chemical Diversion and Trafficking Act.

Personal possession of small amounts of drugs including LSD (40 units or less) was decriminalized in the U.S. state of Oregon on February 1, 2021. This came as a result of the passing of 2020 Oregon Ballot Measure 110. The movement to decriminalize psychedelics in the United States includes LSD in the ongoing effort in California. In November 2020, California Senator Scott Wiener introduced a bill to decriminalize psychedelics such as psilocybin, ayahuasca, ibogaine, and LSD. In April 2021, the bill has been approved by the Senates Public Safety Committee and the Health Committee, in May 2021, it was cleared by the Senate Appropriations Committee and approved by the California Senate, and in June 2021, advanced by the Assembly Public Safety Committee. In mid 2022, the bill was gutted by committee and limited to organizing a study. Wiener announced that he is planning to reintroduce the bill in 2023.

Mexico
In April 2009, the Mexican Congress approved changes in the General Health Law that decriminalized the possession of illegal drugs for immediate consumption and personal use, allowing a person to possess a moderate amount of LSD. The only restriction is that people in possession of drugs should not be within a 300-meter radius of schools, police departments, or correctional facilities. Marijuana, along with cocaine, opium, heroin, and other drugs were also decriminalized; their possession is not considered a crime as long as the dose does not exceed the limit established in the General Health Law. Many question this, as cocaine is as synthesised as heroin, and both are produced as extracts from plants. The law establishes very low amount thresholds and strictly defines personal dosage. For those arrested with more than the threshold allowed by the law this can result in heavy prison sentences, as they will be assumed to be small traffickers even if there are no other indications that the amount was meant for selling.

Czech Republic
In the Czech Republic, until 31 December 1998, only drug possession "for other person" (i.e. intent to sell) was criminal (apart from production, importation, exportation, offering or mediation, which was and remains criminal) while possession for personal use remained legal.

On 1 January 1999, an amendment of the Criminal Code, which was necessitated in order to align the Czech drug rules with the Single Convention on Narcotic Drugs, became effective, criminalizing possession of "amount larger than small" also for personal use (Art. 187a of the Criminal Code) while possession of small amounts for personal use became a misdemeanor.

The judicial practice came to the conclusion that the "amount larger than small" must be five to ten times larger (depending on drug) than a usual single dose of an average consumer.

Under the Regulation No. 467/2009 Coll, possession of less than 5 doses of LSD was to be considered smaller than large for the purposes of the Criminal Code and was to be treated as a misdemeanor subject to a fine equal to a parking ticket.

Ecuador
According to the 2008 Constitution of Ecuador, in its Article 364, the Ecuadorian state does not see drug consumption as a crime but only as a health concern. Since June 2013 the State drugs regulatory office CONSEP has published a table which establishes maximum quantities carried by persons so as to be considered in legal possession and that person as not a seller of drugs. The "CONSEP established, at their latest general meeting, that the 0.020 milligrams of LSD shall be considered the maximum consumer amount.

Economics

Price
The street price of a single dose of LSD can be anywhere from $2 to $50. In Europe, as of 2011, the typical cost of a dose was between 4.50 and 25.

Production

An active dose of LSD is very minute, allowing a large number of doses to be synthesized from a comparatively small amount of raw material. Twenty five kilograms of precursor ergotamine tartrate can produce 5–6 kg of pure crystalline LSD; this corresponds to around 50–60 million doses at 100 µg. Because the masses involved are so small, concealing and transporting illicit LSD is much easier than smuggling cocaine, cannabis, or other illegal drugs.

Manufacturing LSD requires laboratory equipment and experience in the field of organic chemistry. It takes two to three days to produce 30 to 100 grams of pure compound. It is believed that LSD is not usually produced in large quantities, but rather in a series of small batches. This technique minimizes the loss of precursor chemicals in case a step does not work as expected.

Forms

LSD is produced in crystalline form and is then mixed with excipients or redissolved for production in ingestible forms. Liquid solution is either distributed in small vials or, more commonly, sprayed onto or soaked into a distribution medium. Historically, LSD solutions were first sold on sugar cubes, but practical considerations forced a change to tablet form. Appearing in 1968 as an orange tablet measuring about 6 mm across, "Orange Sunshine" acid was the first largely available form of LSD after its possession was made illegal. Tim Scully, a prominent chemist, made some of these tablets, but said that most "Sunshine" in the USA came by way of Ronald Stark, who imported approximately thirty-five million doses from Europe.

Over a period of time, tablet dimensions, weight, shape and concentration of LSD evolved from large (4.5–8.1 mm diameter), heavyweight (≥150 mg), round, high concentration (90–350 µg/tab) dosage units to small (2.0–3.5 mm diameter) lightweight (as low as 4.7 µg/tab), variously shaped, lower concentration (12–85 µg/tab, average range 30–40 µg/tab) dosage units. LSD tablet shapes have included cylinders, cones, stars, spacecraft, and heart shapes. The smallest tablets became known as "Microdots."

After tablets came "computer acid" or "blotter paper LSD," typically made by dipping a preprinted sheet of blotting paper into an LSD/water/alcohol solution. More than 200 types of LSD tablets have been encountered since 1969 and more than 350 blotter paper designs have been observed since 1975. About the same time as blotter paper LSD came "Windowpane" (AKA "Clearlight"), which contained LSD inside a thin gelatin square a quarter of an inch (6 mm) across.  LSD has been sold under a wide variety of often short-lived and regionally restricted street names including Acid, Trips, Uncle Sid, Blotter, Lucy, Alice and doses, as well as names that reflect the designs on the sheets of blotter paper. Authorities have encountered the drug in other forms—including powder or crystal, and capsule.

Modern distribution
LSD manufacturers and traffickers in the United States can be categorized into two groups: A few large-scale producers, and an equally limited number of small, clandestine chemists, consisting of independent producers who, operating on a comparatively limited scale, can be found throughout the country.

As a group, independent producers are of less concern to the Drug Enforcement Administration than the large-scale groups because their product reaches only local markets.

Many LSD dealers and chemists describe a religious or humanitarian purpose that motivates their illicit activity. Nicholas Schou's book Orange Sunshine: The Brotherhood of Eternal Love and Its Quest to Spread Peace, Love, and Acid to the World describes one such group, the Brotherhood of Eternal Love. The group was a major American LSD trafficking group in the late 1960s and early 1970s.

In the second half of the 20th century, dealers and chemists loosely associated with the Grateful Dead like Owsley Stanley, Nicholas Sand, Karen Horning, Sarah Maltzer, "Dealer McDope," and Leonard Pickard played an essential role in distributing LSD.

Mimics

Since 2005, law enforcement in the United States and elsewhere has seized several chemicals and combinations of chemicals in blotter paper which were sold as LSD mimics, including DOB, a mixture of DOC and DOI, 25I-NBOMe, and a mixture of DOC and DOB. Many mimics are toxic in comparatively small doses, or have extremely different safety profiles. Many street users of LSD are often under the impression that blotter paper which is actively hallucinogenic can only be LSD because that is the only chemical with low enough doses to fit on a small square of blotter paper. While it is true that LSD requires lower doses than most other hallucinogens, blotter paper is capable of absorbing a much larger amount of material. The DEA performed a chromatographic analysis of blotter paper containing 2C-C which showed that the paper contained a much greater concentration of the active chemical than typical LSD doses, although the exact quantity was not determined. Blotter LSD mimics can have relatively small dose squares; a sample of blotter paper containing DOC seized by Concord, California police had dose markings approximately 6 mm apart. Several deaths have been attributed to 25I-NBOMe.

Research
A number of organizations—including the Beckley Foundation, MAPS, Heffter Research Institute and the Albert Hofmann Foundation—exist to fund, encourage and coordinate research into the medicinal and spiritual uses of LSD and related psychedelics. New clinical LSD experiments in humans started in 2009 for the first time in 35 years. As it is illegal in many areas of the world, potential medical uses are difficult to study.

In 2001 the United States Drug Enforcement Administration stated that LSD "produces no aphrodisiac effects, does not increase creativity, has no lasting positive effect in treating alcoholics or criminals, does not produce a "model psychosis", and does not generate immediate personality change." More recently, experimental uses of LSD have included the treatment of alcoholism, pain and cluster headache relief, and prospective studies on depression. There is evidence that psychedelics induce molecular and cellular adaptations related to neuroplasticity and that these could potentially underlie therapeutic benefits.

Psychedelic therapy

In the 1950s and 1960s LSD was used in psychiatry to enhance psychotherapy known as psychedelic therapy. Some psychiatrists, such as Ronald A. Sandison who pioneered its use at Powick Hospital in England, believed LSD was especially useful at helping patients to "unblock" repressed subconscious material through other psychotherapeutic methods, and also for treating alcoholism. One study concluded, "The root of the therapeutic value of the LSD experience is its potential for producing self-acceptance and self-surrender," presumably by forcing the user to face issues and problems in that individual's psyche.

Two recent reviews concluded that conclusions drawn from most of these early trials are unreliable due to serious methodological flaws.  These include the absence of adequate control groups, lack of followup, and vague criteria for therapeutic outcome.  In many cases studies failed to convincingly demonstrate whether the drug or the therapeutic interaction was responsible for any beneficial effects.

In recent years organizations like the Multidisciplinary Association for Psychedelic Studies have renewed clinical research of LSD.

It has been proposed that LSD be studied for use in the therapeutic setting particularly in anxiety.

Other uses
In the 1950s and 1960s, some psychiatrists (e.g. Oscar Janiger) explored the potential effect of LSD on creativity. Experimental studies attempted to measure the effect of LSD on creative activity and aesthetic appreciation.

Since 2008 there has been ongoing research into using LSD to alleviate anxiety for terminally ill cancer patients coping with their impending deaths.

A 2012 meta-analysis found evidence that a single dose of LSD in conjunction with various alcoholism treatment programs was associated with a decrease in alcohol abuse, lasting for several months, but no effect was seen at one year. Adverse events included seizure, moderate confusion and agitation, nausea, vomiting, and acting in a bizarre fashion.

LSD has been used as a treatment for cluster headaches with positive results in some small studies.

Recently, researchers discovered that LSD is a potent psychoplastogen, a compound capable of promoting rapid and sustained neural plasticity that may have wide-ranging therapeutic benefit. LSD has been shown to increase markers of neuroplasticity in human brain organoids and improve memory performance in human subjects.

LSD may have analgesic properties related to pain in terminally ill patients and phantom pain and may be useful for treating inflammatory diseases including rheumatoid arthritis.

Notable individuals
Some notable individuals have commented publicly on their experiences with LSD. Some of these comments date from the era when it was legally available in the US and Europe for non-medical uses, and others pertain to psychiatric treatment in the 1950s and 1960s. Still others describe experiences with illegal LSD, obtained for philosophic, artistic, therapeutic, spiritual, or recreational purposes.
 W. H. Auden, the poet, said, "I myself have taken mescaline once and L.S.D. once.  Aside from a slight schizophrenic dissociation of the I from the Not-I, including my body, nothing happened at all." He also said, "LSD was a complete frost. … What it does seem to destroy is the power of communication. I have listened to tapes done by highly articulate people under LSD, for example, and they talk absolute drivel. They may have seen something interesting, but they certainly lose either the power or the wish to communicate." He also said, "Nothing much happened but I did get the distinct impression that some birds were trying to communicate with me."
 Daniel Ellsberg, an American peace activist, says he has had several hundred experiences with psychedelics.
 Richard Feynman, a notable physicist at California Institute of Technology, tried LSD during his professorship at Caltech. Feynman largely sidestepped the issue when dictating his anecdotes; he mentions it in passing in the "O Americano, Outra Vez" section.
 Jerry Garcia stated in a July 3, 1989 interview for Relix Magazine, in response to the question "Have your feelings about LSD changed over the years?," "They haven't changed much. My feelings about LSD are mixed. It's something that I both fear and that I love at the same time. I never take any psychedelic, have a psychedelic experience, without having that feeling of, "I don't know what's going to happen." In that sense, it's still fundamentally an enigma and a mystery."
 Bill Gates implied in an interview with Playboy that he tried LSD during his youth.
 Aldous Huxley, author of Brave New World, became a user of psychedelics after moving to Hollywood. He was at the forefront of the counterculture's use of psychedelic drugs, which led to his 1954 work The Doors of Perception. Dying from cancer, he asked his wife on 22 November 1963 to inject him with 100 µg of LSD. He died later that day.
 Steve Jobs, co-founder and former CEO of Apple Inc., said, "Taking LSD was a profound experience, one of the most important things in my life."
 Ernst Jünger, German writer and philosopher, throughout his life had experimented with drugs such as ether, cocaine, and hashish; and later in life he used mescaline and LSD. These experiments were recorded comprehensively in Annäherungen (1970, Approaches). The novel Besuch auf Godenholm (1952, Visit to Godenholm) is clearly influenced by his early experiments with mescaline and LSD. He met with LSD inventor Albert Hofmann and they took LSD together several times. Hofmann's memoir LSD, My Problem Child describes some of these meetings.
 In a 2004 interview, Paul McCartney said that The Beatles' songs "Day Tripper" and "Lucy in the Sky with Diamonds" were inspired by LSD trips. Nonetheless, John Lennon consistently stated over the course of many years that the fact that the initials of "Lucy in the Sky with Diamonds" spelled out L-S-D was a coincidence (he stated that the title came from a picture drawn by his son Julian) and that the band members did not notice until after the song had been released, and Paul McCartney corroborated that story. John Lennon, George Harrison, and Ringo Starr also used the drug, although McCartney cautioned that "it's easy to overestimate the influence of drugs on the Beatles' music."
Michel Foucault had an LSD experience with Simeon Wade in the Death Valley and later wrote "it was the greatest experience of his life, and that it profoundly changed his life and his work." According to Wade, as soon as he came back to Paris, Foucault scrapped the second History of Sexuality's manuscript, and totally rethought the whole project.
 Kary Mullis is reported to credit LSD with helping him develop DNA amplification technology, for which he received the Nobel Prize in Chemistry in 1993.
 Carlo Rovelli, an Italian theoretical physicist and writer, has credited his use of LSD with sparking his interest in theoretical physics.
 Oliver Sacks, a neurologist famous for writing best-selling case histories about his patients' disorders and unusual experiences, talks about his own experiences with LSD and other perception altering chemicals, in his book, Hallucinations.
 Matt Stone and Trey Parker, creators of the TV series South Park, claimed to have shown up at the 72nd Academy Awards, at which they were nominated for Best Original Song, under the influence of LSD.

See also 

 1P-LSD
 1cP-LSD
 LSD art
 Psychedelic microdosing
 Psychedelic therapy
 Owsley Stanley
 Urban legends about LSD
 Psychoplastogen

Notes

References

Further reading

External links 

 Drug Profiles: LSD European Monitoring Centre for Drugs and Drug Addiction
 LSD-25 at Erowid
 LSD at PsychonautWiki
 LSD entry in TiHKAL • info 
 U.S. National Library of Medicine: Drug Information Portal – Lysergic acid diethylamide

Documentaries
 Hofmann's Potion a documentary on the origins of LSD, 2002
 , documentary film directed by Aron Ranen, 2006
 Inside LSD National Geographic Channel, 2009
 How to Change Your Mind Netflix docuseries, 2022

 
Counterculture of the 1960s
Dopamine agonists
Eli Lilly and Company brands
Entheogens
Light-sensitive chemicals
Mind control
Novartis brands
Serotonin receptor agonists
Swiss inventions
Withdrawn drugs
Wikipedia medicine articles ready to translate
Articles containing video clips